Michael Gau is Taiwanese educator. He served as vice chairperson of the Aviation Safety Council from 21 May 2012 and was replaced by Chi Chia-fen in 2016.

Early life and education
Gau was born in 1963 in Taipei. He obtained his bachelor's degree in law from National Taiwan University in 1987, master's of law specialized in international law from Cambridge University in 1990 and King's College London in the United Kingdom in 1991 and doctoral degree in law from Leiden University in the Netherlands in 1997.

Career
He has taught at National University of Kaohsiung in 2000–2005, Soochow University in 2005–2010, National Taiwan Ocean University in 2010–2017, Hainan University in 2017-2019 and Wuhan University since 2019.

References

Political office-holders in the Republic of China on Taiwan
Living people
National Taiwan University alumni
Alumni of Hughes Hall, Cambridge
Alumni of King's College London
1963 births